Dino Williams (born 31 March 1990) is a Jamaican international footballer who plays for Montego Bay United as a striker.

Career

Club
Williams has played senior club football for Village United, having previously played with Green Pond High and Montego Bay United. In 2012 Williams joined USL Pro Charleston Battery on loan. Williams joined Montego Bay United for the 2013-2014 RSPL season.

In February 2016, Williams joined Indy Eleven on loan for the 2016 season.  Williams suffered a long-term injury while training with Indy and he was returned to Montego Bay United on 30 March 2016.

International career
He made his international debut for Jamaica in 2012.

References

1990 births
Living people
Jamaican footballers
Jamaican expatriate footballers
Jamaica international footballers
Charleston Battery players
Expatriate soccer players in the United States
USL Championship players
Montego Bay United F.C. players
2015 Copa América players
Indy Eleven players
National Premier League players
Association football forwards